The Middle Mississippi River National Wildlife Refuge is located on the Mississippi River downstream from St. Louis, Missouri.  It is managed by the U.S. Fish and Wildlife Service as part of the Mark Twain National Wildlife Refuge Complex.

The refuge consists of three parcels of Mississippi River bottomland, nearly all of it wetland.  They are Meissner Island, near Valmeyer, Illinois; Harlow Island, near Festus, Missouri; and Wilkinson Island, near Gorham, Illinois.

The Middle Mississippi River National Wildlife Refuge has a local headquarters at Rockwood, Illinois in Randolph County. In all, the refuge is located in parts of Jackson, Monroe, and Randolph counties in Illinois, and Jefferson and Perry counties in Missouri. The refuge relies for much of its staffing on the nearby Crab Orchard National Wildlife Refuge near Carbondale, Illinois.

This Refuge was created in response to the Great Flood of 1993.  The three parcels of bottomland that now make up this Refuge had been riverine polders, agricultural land protected by dikes.  After the dikes were breached by this flood, the damaged land parcels were transferred to the federal government.  The Fish and Wildlife Service has announced plans to slowly return these three parcels to the status of semi-natural bottomlands.  Pursuant to these plans, the Middle Mississippi River National Wildlife Refuge was established in May 2000.

References

External links
Middle Mississippi River National Wildlife Refuge

Protected areas of Jefferson County, Missouri
National Wildlife Refuges in Illinois
National Wildlife Refuges in Missouri
Protected areas on the Mississippi River
Protected areas of Perry County, Missouri
Protected areas established in 2000
Protected areas of Jackson County, Illinois
Protected areas of Monroe County, Illinois
Protected areas of Randolph County, Illinois
Wetlands of Illinois
Landforms of Jefferson County, Missouri
Landforms of Perry County, Missouri
Landforms of Jackson County, Illinois
Landforms of Monroe County, Illinois
Landforms of Randolph County, Illinois
Wetlands of Missouri
2000 establishments in Illinois
2000 establishments in Missouri